Huay-Huay District is one of ten districts of the province Yauli in Peru.

See also 
 Chumpi
 Chhuqu P'ukru
 Kiwyu Waqanan
 Kunkus
 Llaksaqucha

References